Rashed Ahmed (Arabic:راشد أحمد) (born 6 August 1986) is an Emirati footballer. He currently plays for Al-Hamriyah as a goalkeeper.

External links

References

Emirati footballers
1986 births
Living people
Sharjah FC players
Al Hamriyah Club players
UAE First Division League players
UAE Pro League players
Association football goalkeepers